Zuarungu Senior High School is  a second cycle co-educational institution in the Upper East region of Ghana.  It is located in Bolgatanga East District in the Upper East region of Ghana.

Enrollment 
The school enrolled 542 students in 2010. This number increased to 585 in 2011 and to 1039 in 2012.

Facilities 
The school has classrooms, a computer laboratory, a science laboratory and library.

Headmasters 

 Daniel Adebuure

Achievement 
The school participates fully in all sporting disciplines organized in the municipality and the region. About ten sports boys and girls from the school contested in the regional athletics team in 2001, 2005, and 2008. In 2012, the school was awarded a trophy in constitution games. It is the first school to win a contest at the regional level of the National Science and Maths Quiz.

References 

High schools in Ghana
Mixed schools in Ghana
Upper East Region
Christian schools in Ghana
Boarding schools in Ghana
Public schools in Ghana